Jackie Smith (born 1940) is an American football player.

Jackie Smith may also refer to:

 Jackie Smith (sociologist) (born 1968), American sociologist
 Jackie Smith (footballer) (1883–1916), English footballer
 Jackie Smith (softball) (born 1969), New Zealand softball player
 Jackie Smith (politician) (born 1956), Iowa state senator

See also
 Jacqui Smith (born 1962), politician
 Jackie Smith-Wood (born 1954), British actress
 Jacqueline Smith (disambiguation)
 Jack Smith (disambiguation)
 John Smith (disambiguation)